Friuli Grave (also Grave del Friuli) is a DOC wine region within Friuli-Venezia Giulia. The area has 16,000 acres (6500ha) of vineyards. The appellation is most known for white wines made from Chardonnay, Sauvignon Blanc, Pinot Grigio and Friulano.
Pinot Grigio is the most important wine of the appellation, but some red wines are also produced  under the Friuli Grave DOC. Reds include from the Bordeaux wine varieties Cabernet Sauvignon and Merlot, along with local variety Refosco dal Peduncolo Rosso.
As in Graves wine, the name of the DOC comes from the gravelly soil.

References 

Wine regions of Italy
Friuli-Venezia Giulia
Italian DOC